is an underground metro station located in Mizuho-ku, Nagoya, Aichi Prefecture, Japan operated by the Nagoya Municipal Subway’s Sakura-dōri Line. It is located 10.4 kilometers from the terminus of the Sakura-dōri Line at Nakamura Kuyakusho Station. The station's name means "Mizuho Ward Office," and as the name indicates, one of the exits is connected directly with Mizuho Ward Office.

History
Mizuho Kuyakusho Station was opened on March 30, 1994.

Lines
 
 (Station number: S12)

Layout
Mizuho Kuyakusho Station has one underground island platform with platform screen doors

Platforms

External links
 Mizuho Kuyakusho Station official web site

References

Railway stations in Japan opened in 1994
Railway stations in Aichi Prefecture